Family Party may refer to:

The Family Party, a defunct Christian political party in New Zealand
Family Party of Germany
Family Coalition Party of Ontario
Working Families Party, a minor political party in the United States founded in New York in 1998
"Family Party" (song), a song by Kyary Pamyu Pamyu
Family Party (film), a feature film written and directed by Pari Mathur
Family Party: 30 Great Games Obstacle Arcade, a party video game on Wii U

See also
Family First Party